The 2019 College Hockey America Women's Ice Hockey Tournament was the 17th tournament in league history played between March 6 and March 8, 2019, at the LECOM Harborcenter in Buffalo, New York. Syracuse won their first tournament and earned College Hockey America's automatic bid into the 2019 NCAA National Collegiate Women's Ice Hockey Tournament

Format
All six CHA Teams participated in the Tournament. On the first day of the Tournament, the top two seeds received a bye, while the #3 seed played the #6 seed, and the #4 seed played the #5 seed in the Quarterfinal round. On the second day, the Semifinal games featured the #1 seed against the lowest remaining seed, while the #2 seed played the highest remaining seed. On the third and final day, the CHA Championship was played between the two Semifinal winners. There was a total of five games.

Standings

Tournament Champion: Syracuse

Note: * denotes overtime period(s)

All five members of the All-Tournament team were from Syracuse. Forward Aonda Hoppner was named the Tournament MVP, while Lauren Bellefontaine and Abby Moloughney rounded out the corps of forwards. Defenders included Lindsey Eastwood, who scored a hat trick in the Semifinal against Mercyhurst, and Jessica DiGirolamo. Ady Cohen was the All-Tournament Goalie with two wins and a .917 Save Percentage.

During the Championship Game, Jaycee Gephard became the Single Season Points Leader (19-32-51) in the Robert Morris Colonials history.

The Tournament Champion earned a berth in the NCAA Tournament to determine the national champion. The Syracuse Orange was the number 8 seed out of 8 in the tournament, and lost to #1 seed Wisconsin 4–0 on March 16, in Madison, Wisconsin

References

College Hockey America Women's Ice Hockey Tournament
21st century in Buffalo, New York
CHA Women's Ice Hockey Tournament
Sports in Buffalo, New York